Sergey Koryazhkin (born 2 January 1960) is a Soviet fencer. He won a silver medal in the team sabre event at the 1988 Summer Olympics.

References

External links
 

1960 births
Living people
Soviet male fencers
Olympic fencers of the Soviet Union
Fencers at the 1988 Summer Olympics
Olympic silver medalists for the Soviet Union
Olympic medalists in fencing
Medalists at the 1988 Summer Olympics